Mollard may refer to :
 Didier Mollard (born 1969), a French ski jumper who competed from 1986 to 1997
 Jean Mollard, a French engineer who invented with Jacques-Yves Cousteau the SP-350 Denise "Diving saucer"
 Philibert Mollard (1801–1873), a French general
 Tikhon Mollard (born 1966) is an Eastern Orthodox bishop and the Primate of the Orthodox Church in America, holding the rank of Metropolitan of All America and Canada

 Places 
 Palais Mollard-Clary, a baroque palace in Vienna, Austria
 Col du Mollard, a high mountain pass in the Alps

 Other uses

Mollard (grape), another name for the red wine grape Carignan

See also
 Molard (disambiguation)